N. africana may refer to:
 Neurospora africana, a fungus species in the genus Neurospora
 Nicotiana africana, a plant species endemic to Namibia
 Nocardia africana, a gram-positive bacterium species in the genus Nocardia

See also
 Africana (disambiguation)